Grylloblatta chintimini is a species of rock crawler in the family Grylloblattidae. It is found in the state of Oregon in the United States.

Its type locality is Marys Peak in Oregon.

References

Further reading

 
 

Grylloblattidae
Articles created by Qbugbot
Insects described in 2015